Alexandr Shvedov (born 11 April 1973) is a Kazakhstani water polo goalkeeper. At the 2012 Summer Olympics, he competed for the Kazakhstan men's national water polo team in the men's event. He is 6 ft 6 inches tall.

See also
 Kazakhstan men's Olympic water polo team records and statistics
 List of men's Olympic water polo tournament goalkeepers

References

External links
 

1973 births
Living people
Sportspeople from Almaty
Kazakhstani male water polo players
Water polo goalkeepers
Olympic water polo players of Kazakhstan
Water polo players at the 2000 Summer Olympics
Water polo players at the 2004 Summer Olympics
Water polo players at the 2012 Summer Olympics
Asian Games medalists in water polo
Water polo players at the 1998 Asian Games
Water polo players at the 2002 Asian Games
Water polo players at the 2006 Asian Games
Water polo players at the 2010 Asian Games
Asian Games gold medalists for Kazakhstan
Asian Games bronze medalists for Kazakhstan
Medalists at the 1998 Asian Games
Medalists at the 2002 Asian Games
Medalists at the 2006 Asian Games
Medalists at the 2010 Asian Games